Ernest Anderson was an American actor.  He became known for his role in In This Our Life in 1942, where he portrayed a young paralegal who is falsely accused of manslaughter.

Personal life 
Anderson attended Dunbar High School in Washington, D.C. and later got a bachelor's degree from Northwestern University.  He moved to California to work in film.  He served briefly in the army at the end of the Second World War, before returning to Los Angeles.

Acting career 
Anderson moved to Hollywood and took a job with Warner Brothers.  His first acting role was in In This Our Life.  Bette Davis had arranged Anderson's interview for the part of Parry Clay in that film.  He returned to Warner Brothers after serving in World War II, and continued acting until the late 1960s.

Selected filmography 

 In This Our Life (1942) - Parry Clay 
 The Peanut Man (1947)
 The Well (1952) - Mr. Crawford 
 Band Wagon (1953) - Train Porter 
 North by Northwest (1959) - Porter 
 Whatever Happened to Baby Jane (1962) - Ice cream cone seller
 Tick, Tick, Tick (1970) - Homer 
 Coma (1972) - First Doctor 
 Last of the Good Guys (1978) - Uncle Stan 
 The Return (1980) - Dr. Mortorff

References 

20th-century American male actors